West Tripoli Lake is a lake in the Lake Superior drainage basin in Algoma District, northeastern Ontario, Canada. The Canadian Pacific Railway transcontinental main line passes at the northeast tip of the lake.

The primary outflow is an unnamed creek to Tripoli Lake, which flows via the Tripoli Creek and the Magpie River into Lake Superior.

See also
List of lakes in Ontario

References

Lakes of Algoma District